Ned Dennehy (born 8 December 1965) is an Irish actor who has appeared in multiple films and television programmes. He is best known for his role as Mider in The Mystic Knights of Tir Na Nog. He also appeared in Blitz, Harry Potter and the Deathly Hallows – Part 1 and the independent British feature film Downhill.

Dennehy's television work includes RTÉ's Damo and Ivor, Glitch and the BBC dramas Parade's End, Luther, Banished and Dickensian. He also appeared as Charlie Strong in Peaky Blinders. In 2017, he appeared in both the major TV productions Versailles and Broken and also won an IFTA Award for his supporting role as Irish Pat in TG4's An Klondike. Dennehy also portrayed Hastur in Good Omens.

Filmography

Film

Television

References

External links 
 

Living people
Irish male film actors
21st-century Irish male actors
1965 births
Irish male television actors
20th-century Irish male actors